Miquihuana is a genus of ground beetles in the family Carabidae. This genus has a single species, Miquihuana rhadiniformis. It is found in Mexico.

References

Platyninae